Five warships of Sweden have been named Kalmar, after Kalmar:

 , a warship launched in 1677.
 , a warship launched in 1749.
 , a galley launched in 1749 and stricken in 1810.
 , a  launched in 1943 and stricken in 1978.
 , a  launched in 1990 and since in active service.

:Category:Swedish Navy ship names